Nadaud is a French surname. Notable people with the surname include:

Alain Nadaud (1948–2015), French writer and diplomat
Gustave Nadaud (1820–1893), French songwriter
Martin Nadaud (1815–1898), French politician
Noémie Nadaud (born 1995), French acrobatic gymnast
Serge Nadaud (1906–1995), French actor
Valérie Nadaud (born 1968), French racewalker

French-language surnames